

Films

References

1989 in LGBT history
1989